The Case of the Late Pig is a crime novel by English writer Margery Allingham, first published 1937, by Hodder & Stoughton. It is the ninth novel featuring the mysterious Albert Campion and his butler/valet/bodyguard Magersfontein Lugg.

Plot summary
As Lugg is reading aloud the obituaries one morning, he comes across one for an old school nemesis of Campion.  Remarkably, an anonymous letter inviting Campion to the funeral has also appeared in the morning post.  R.I. “Pig” Peters is dead.  So says the doctor that treated him.

Five months later, Campion receives a panicked call from a friend, something about a murder.  Campion drives down to the friend’s home where her father reveals the most assuredly dead body of R.I. “Pig” Peters, his head caved in no more than 12 hours earlier.

Amazingly enough, some of the visitors from Peters' first funeral also appear, along with some not-so-grieving acquaintances of the late Pig.  The little village is becoming very crowded.

Now begins Campion’s search, which leads to a missing body, a grisly scarecrow and one too many beers for Lugg before he discovers the madman that planned more than a few murders.

This is the only Albert Campion story told in the first person by Campion.

Television
In two series of BBC adaptations of Allingham's stories entitled Campion (shown in the United States by PBS), Campion was played by Peter Davison, Lugg by Brian Glover and Oates by Andrew Burt. In the first series, Peter Davison sang the title music himself.

Campion adapted a total of eight novels, each of which was originally broadcast as two separate hour-long episodes.

Series 1 (1989)
The Case of the Late Pig,   Season 1, Episode 3, 
 Original Air Date: 19 February 1989

References
 Margery Allingham, The Case of the Late Pig, (Hodder & Stoughton, 1937)
 Margery Allingham, The Case of the Late Pig, (Vintage, Random House, 2005)

External links
 
An Allingham bibliography, with dates and publishers, from the UK Margery Allingham Society.uk/bibliography
A series of Allingham plot summaries, including many Campion books, from the UK Margery Allingham Society

1937 British novels
Novels by Margery Allingham
Hodder & Stoughton books